Saparbek Dibirovich Safarov (born 14 October 1986) is a Russian mixed martial artist, who competes in the light heavyweight division. He competed for the Ultimate Fighting Championship.

Mixed martial arts career
Safarov started his career with 8 straight victories that included 6 knockouts and 2 submissions. He was then called in for a short replacement fight against Gian Villante. Gian's original opponent, Patrick Cummins, pulled out of the fight with a staph infection. Safarov suffered the first loss of his career by knockout in a back and forth fight. Both participants were awarded Fight of the Night for their performance.

Safarov was next expected to fight Marcos Rogério de Lima at UFC Fight Night 115. However, Lima tested positive for banned anabolic steroids and the bout was cancelled.

Safarov faced Tyson Pedro on February 11, 2018 at UFC 221. He lost the fight via kimura submission in the first round.

Safarov was expected to face Alonzo Menifield on November 10, 2018 at UFC Fight Night 139.  However, it was reported on October 21, 2018 that Safarov pulled out from the event due to undisclosed reasons and the bout was scrapped.

Safarov was scheduled to face Gökhan Saki on March 16, 2019 at UFC Fight Night 147. However, Saki pulled out of the fight in late February due to an undisclosed injury. Saki was replaced by Nicolae Negumereanu. Safarov won the fight via unanimous decision.

Safarov was expected to face promotional newcomer Da Un Jung on August 31, 2019 at UFC Fight Night 157. However, on August 5, 2019, Safarov was pulled from the bout for undisclosed reasons.

Safarov faced Rodolfo Vieira in a middleweight bout on March 7, 2020 at UFC 248. He lost the fight via an arm-triangle submission in the first round.

Safarov was scheduled to face Julian Marquez on August 29, 2020 at UFC Fight Night 175. However, the bout was moved to UFC Fight Night: Felder vs. dos Anjos on November 14 after Safarov faced travel restrictions related to the COVID-19 pandemic. In turn, Safarov pulled out due to weight cut issues a day before the event and the pairing was canceled once again.

On December 8, 2020, it was announced that the UFC had released him.

Championships and accomplishments

Mixed martial arts
Ultimate Fighting Championship
Fight of the Night (One time) vs. Gian Villante

Mixed martial arts record

|-
|Loss
|align=center|9–3
|Rodolfo Vieira
|Submission (arm-triangle choke)
|UFC 248
|
|align=center|1
|align=center|2:58
|Las Vegas, Nevada, United States
|
|-
|Win
|align=center|9–2
|Nicolae Negumereanu
|Decision (unanimous)
|UFC Fight Night: Till vs. Masvidal 
|
|align=center|3
|align=center|5:00
|London, England
|
|-
|Loss
|align=center|8–2
|Tyson Pedro
|Submission (kimura)
|UFC 221 
|
|align=center|1
|align=center|3:54
|Perth, Australia
|
|-
|Loss
|align=center|8–1
|Gian Villante
|TKO (punches)
|UFC Fight Night: Lewis vs. Abdurakhimov
|
|align=center|2
|align=center|2:54
|Albany, New York, United States
|
|-
|Win
|align=center|8–0
|Rodney Wallace
|TKO (corner stoppage)
|WFCA 17
|
|align=center|2
|align=center|5:00
|Grozny, Russia
|
|-
| Win
| align=center| 7–0
| Giga Kukhalashvili
| Submission (triangle choke)
| ProFC 54
| 
| align=center| 1
| align=center| 2:13
| Rostov-on-Don, Russia
|
|-
| Win
| align=center| 6–0
| Valdas Pocevicius
| KO (punches)
| Battle of Stars 1
| 
| align=center| 1
| align=center| 0:00
| Makhachkala, Russia
|
|-
| Win
| align=center| 5–0
| Igor Sliusarchuk
| TKO (punches)
| World Ultimate Full Contact
| 
| align=center| 1
| align=center| 2:54
| Makhachkala, Russia
| 
|-
| Win
| align=center| 4–0
| Igor Litoshik
| TKO (punches)
| M-1 Global
| 
| align=center| 1
| align=center| 3:00
| Kyiv, Ukraine
|
|-
| Win
| align=center| 3–0
| Adrian Mallebranche
| TKO (punches)
| M-1 Selection 2011
| 
| align=center| 1
| align=center| 0:04
| Makhachkala, Russia
| 
|-
| Win
| align=center| 2–0
| Vasily Klepikov
| Submission (rear-naked choke)
| M-1 Selection 2010
| 
| align=center| 1
| align=center| 1:18
| Kyiv, Ukraine
| 
|-
| Win
| align=center| 1–0
| Visampasha Mirzakhanov
| TKO (punches)
| Legion Fight 5
| 
| align=center| 1
| align=center| 0:49
| Krasnodar, Russia
|

See also
 List of male mixed martial artists

References

External links
 
 

1986 births
Russian male mixed martial artists
Light heavyweight mixed martial artists
Middleweight mixed martial artists
Living people
Sportspeople from Makhachkala
Dagestani mixed martial artists
Mixed martial artists utilizing sambo
Mixed martial artists utilizing freestyle wrestling
Russian sambo practitioners
Avar people
Ultimate Fighting Championship male fighters